The Matthews-Bryan House is a historic house at 320 Dooley Road, North Little Rock, Arkansas.  It is a two-story masonry structure, built in the English Revival style in 1930 by the Justin Matthews Corporation as part of its Park Hill development.  It has a steeply pitched gable roof, with cross-gabled entrance, and is faced in stone and brick.  It was designed by Matthews Company architect Frank Carmean, and was one of the last houses built by Matthews before the full effects of the Great Depression affected his building style.  As with most of Frank Carmean's homes, there are arches throughout and a full sized guest house in the rear. 

The house was listed on the National Register of Historic Places in 1992.

See also
National Register of Historic Places listings in Pulaski County, Arkansas

References

Houses on the National Register of Historic Places in Arkansas
Houses completed in 1930
Houses in North Little Rock, Arkansas